Heterodera bifenestra (cereal cyst nematode) is a plant pathogenic nematode, that is a causal agent of the cereal cyst nematode.

References 

bifenestra
Plant pathogenic nematodes
Nematodes described in 1955